Kevin Knabjian (born July 5, 1984) is a retired American mixed martial artist of Armenian descent. A professional from 2003 until 2012, he competed for the UFC and the WEC.

Mixed martial arts career
Knabjian went to Eastern Illinois University, from which he graduated with a degree in Business Management. Together with fellow EIU student, Brian Ebersole, he started practicing MMA when he was in his freshman year of college. He also wrestled for EIU, a Division 1 school.

In his professional debut Knabjian fought Adam Gibson to a draw. His WEC debut ended unsuccessfully when he was knocked out by Brock Larson only 27 seconds into the fight; he went on to compete in other promotions, such as XFO, where he has drawn attention as the title fight of XFO 22, defeating Ultimate Fighter 1 fighter Josh Rafferty by TKO.

Mixed martial arts record

|-
|Loss
|align=center|12–7–1
|Drew Fickett
|Submission (guillotine choke)
|WMMA 1: Fighting for a Better World
|
|align=center|1
|align=center|3:38
|El Paso, Texas, United States
|Lightweight bout.
|-
|Win
|align=center|12–6–1
|Brandon Adamson
|Submission (kimura)
|XFO 42: Xtreme Fighting Organization
|
|align=center|1
|align=center|1:44
|Hoffman Estates, Illinois, United States
|
|-
|Win
|align=center|11–6–1
|John Tarrh
|Submission (punches)
|PCF: TWC 9: Berserk
|
|align=center|1
|align=center|0:36
|Indianapolis, Indiana, United States
|
|-
|Loss
|align=center|10–6–1
|Nick Duell
|KO (head kick)
|NAAFS: Caged Vengeance 9
|
|align=center|2
|align=center|1:01
|Canton, Ohio, United States
|
|-
|Loss
|align=center|10–5–1
|Brian Gassaway
|Decision (unanimous)
|Bellator 25
|
|align=center|3
|align=center|5:00
|Chicago, Illinois, United States
|
|-
|Loss
|align=center|10–4–1
|Jacob Volkmann
|Submission (D'arce choke)
|Bellator 7
|
|align=center|2
|align=center|1:42
|Chicago, Illinois, United States
|
|-
|Win
|align=center|10–3–1
|Jacob Kuester
|Submission (heel hook)
|Extreme Challenge 101
|
|align=center| 1
|align=center| 4:26
|Franklin, Wisconsin, United States
|
|-
|Win
|align=center|9–3–1
|Mario Stapel
|TKO (punches)
|Primetime Fighting Championships
|
|align=center|1
|align=center|2:02
|Merrillville, Indiana, United States
|
|-
|Win
|align=center|8–3–1
|Josh Rafferty
|TKO (punches)
|Xtreme Fighting Organization 22
|
|align=center|1
|align=center|1:58
|Crystal Lake, Illinois, United States
|
|-
|Win
|align=center|7–3–1
|Josh Lee
|Submission (rear-naked choke)
|AB: Lockdown
|
|align=center|1
|align=center|3:51
|Chicago, Illinois, United States
|
|-
|Loss
|align=center|6–3–1
|Brock Larson
|TKO (punches)
|WEC 28
|
|align=center|1
|align=center|0:27
|Las Vegas, Nevada, United States
|
|-
|Win
|align=center|6–2–1
|Jedrzej Kubski
|TKO (punches)
|IMMAC 2: Attack
|
|align=center|2
|align=center|1:20
|Chicago, Illinois, United States
|
|-  
|Win
|align=center|5–2–1
|Grant Sarver
|Submission (armbar)
|CFC 1: Explosion
|
|align=center|2
|align=center|0:48
|Tinley Park, Illinois, United States
|
|-
|Win
|align=center|4–2–1
|Joe Geromiller
|TKO (punches)
|Courage Fighting Championships 7
|
|align=center|3
|align=center|0:55
|Decatur, Illinois, United States
|
|-
|Win
|align=center|3–2–1
|Randy Newell
|Submission (armbar)
|APEX: Undisputed
|
|align=center|1
|align=center|0:55
|Montreal, Quebec, Canada
|
|-  
|Win
|align=center|2–2–1
|Andre Garcia
|TKO
|DC 2: Duneland Classic 2
|
|align=center|1
|align=center|N/A
|Portage, Indiana, United States
|
|-
|Loss
|align=center|1–2–1
|LaVerne Clark
|KO (punch)
|Courage Fighting Championships 1
|
|align=center|2
|align=center|0:10
|Decatur, Illinois, United States
|Welterweight debut.
|-
|Loss
|align=center|1–1–1
|Miguel Gutierrez
|Submission (rear-naked choke)
|Cage Fighting Championship: Ultimate Fighting Mexico
|
|align=center|2
|align=center|N/A
|Monterrey, Mexico
|
|-
|Win
|align=center|1–0–1
|Nino Marroquin
|TKO (punches)
|CFM: Cage Fighting Monterrey
|
|align=center|3
|align=center|N/A
|Monterrey, Mexico
|
|-
| Draw
|align=center|0–0–1
|Adam Gibson
|Draw
|Shooto: Midwest Fighting
|
|align=center|2
|align=center|5:00
|Hammond, Indiana, United States
|
|-

References

External links

1984 births
Living people
Sportspeople from Chicago
Eastern Illinois University alumni
American people of Armenian descent
American male mixed martial artists
Mixed martial artists from Illinois
Welterweight mixed martial artists